René Maillard (8 April 1931 – 4 December 2012) was a French composer.

Life 
Born in Bois-Colombes, Maillard had his first violin lessons during the Second World War with Charles Maillier, who was a violin teacher in Limoges. He was then a student of Arthur Hoérée and at the Conservatory of Versailles with Aimé Steck before he entered the Conservatoire de Paris where he won first prizes for harmony, counterpoint and fugue in the classes of Marcel Samuel-Rousseau and Noël Gallon. A student of Tony Aubin for musical composition, he was awarded a Second Grand Prix de Rome for his cantata Le rire de Gargantua by Randal Lemoine (after Rabelais) in 1955 during his first competition. The piece, performed by the Orchestra of the Opéra Comique with singers René Bianco, Louis Rialland and Jacqueline Cauchard conducted by Jean Fournet, earned him the Second Grand Prix. 

He was then hired by EMI in 1957 as assistant to the "classical" artistic director René Challan, a position he held until 1960. In particular, he was responsible for recordings by artists such as Samson François, Heitor Villa-Lobos, Paul Tortelier, Aldo Ciccolini.

Despite a favourable reception for his first compositions, the dislocation of the group "Pentacorde" and the appearance of the "serialist episode" encouraged him to abandon music for good. He then made a career as a senior executive in an international company.

His works have been performed by artists such as Jean Hubeau, André Collard, Robert Quatrocchi, Hélène Pignari, Jean Della-Valle, the Orchestre de chambre de la radio conducted by Louis de Froment, the Orchestre de chambre de Versailles conducted by Bernard Wahl. In 1960 the Festival d'Aix-en-Provence gave the creation of his Concerto da camera N°2 for strings under the direction of Serge Baudo.

After an interruption of forty years, Nicolas Bacri encouraged him to return to composition. Maillart began composing again in the early 2000s. Among others, a Sonata for viola and piano (for the duo Arnaud Thorette and Johan Farjot) and a string trio commissioned by the Trio des Solistes de Cannes (Berhilde Dufour, Eszter Biro and Philippe Cauchefer) were composed. About Maillard, Nicolas Bacri wrote:
... a new generation of performers is discovering (his work), sensitive to the charm of a discourse that is both dense and clear, part of a timeless classicism which, from Couperin to Dutilleux, via Roussel, has always been the mark of the great "French musicians".

Maillard died in Nice (Alpes-Maritimes) in 2012.

Works

At éditions Delatour France 
 Sonata No. 1 for viola and piano, Op. 5 (1952, revised 2009)
 Sonata No. 2 for viola and piano, Op. 18 (2003)
 String Trio
 Sonata for violin and piano
 Petite suite for 2 double basses
 Le Bal des champs for 3 voice choir, solo soprano and piano
 Prélude Aria et Fugue for cello and organ
 Fébrilité, 3 melodies on poems by 
 Hymne et Toccata for organ
 Toccata for piano
 Concerto da camera No. 1 for strings
 Concerto da camera No. 2 for strings (Disque Naxos)
 Concerto grosso for wind quintet and string orchestra (Disque Naxos)

At éditions « Le Chant du Monde » 
 String Quartet
 Wind Quintet
 Duo Sonata for Violin (disc TRITON)
 Survivre après Hiroshima, cantata for mezzo-soprano, choir and orchestra (Naxos Records)
 Sonata for organ

References

External links 
 Maillard, Sonate pour piano (YouTube)

French classical composers
French male classical composers
French male composers
Conservatoire de Paris alumni
Prix de Rome for composition
People from Bois-Colombes
1931 births
2012 deaths